Splash and Bubbles (also known as Jim Henson's Splash and Bubbles) is an American computer-animated children's television series created by John Tartaglia. The series debuted on PBS Kids on November 23, 2016, after Wild Kratts: Creatures of the Deep Sea. It is produced using motion capture that blends with animatronic interfaces which enables the crew to make animation.

Premise
Splash and Bubbles follows a yellowback fusilier (though at times he and the narrator claim that he is a yellowtail fusilier), Splash, who settles in Reeftown after looking all over the ocean. He then befriends Bubbles, a mandarin dragonet, and the duo, along with friends Dunk and Ripple, explore the reef to venture and make new friends. Each episode also includes a documentary segment, Get Your Feet Wet, which features kids asking questions that are occasionally followed up by a musical number.

Characters

Main
 Splash (voiced by John Tartaglia), the protagonist of the series, is an adventurous yellowback fusilier who settles in Reeftown after exploring the world for a new home.
 Bubbles (voiced by Leslie Carrara-Rudolph), Splash’s best friend who is a tomboyish mandarin dragonet and likes being messy.
 Dunk (voiced by Raymond Carr) is an intellectual, but extremely nervous dog-faced pufferfish who serves as the comic relief of the group. He is also an artist, and can make art out of sand.
 Ripple (voiced by Aymee Garcia) is a pink Barbour's seahorse who lives with 499 brothers. She loves adventure and trying new things.

Recurring
 Lu (voiced by Donna Kimball) is a high-spirited footballfish who resides in the ocean abyss, along with her husband Bob, who is embedded into her body. Her name is short for bioluminescent.
 Bob (voiced by Allan Trautman) is Lu's husband, a male footballfish that lives on the left side of her body.
 Biggie (voiced by Sarah Oh) is one of Lu's friends, a spookfish who has big eyes.
 The firefly squid are one of Lu's friends.
 Pearline is a clam with a pearl inside. She desires her experience in going to Reeftown with help from the Reeftown Rangers.
 The clusterwink (voiced by Sarah Oh) is a species of small sea snail that Lu gave Dunk.
 Zee (voiced by Donna Kimball) is an adventurous zebra bullhead shark who lives for danger.
 Mayor Sting (voiced by Raymond Carr), an overconfident bluespotted ribbontail ray, who is the mayor of Reeftown.
 Wave (voiced by Dan Garza) is Reeftown's day octopus traffic guard. He has an extensive knowledge of the ocean, and often assists the gang in their adventures.
 Tidy (voiced by John Tartaglia) is an ablutomanic garabaldi, who serves as a kelp forest ranger.
 Gush (voiced by Allan Trautman) is an intelligent painted frogfish who is shown to have experience in dancing, helpful tips, and racing.
 Flo (voiced by Leslie Carrara-Rudolph) is a hawksbill sea turtle who acts as Reeftown's medical professional. She sings in the style of Karen Carpenter.
Iris is a shy bluelashed butterflyfish who tries to find fit into her new lifestyle at Reeftown.
 Chompy (voiced by Aymee Garcia) is a pastel-colored parrotfish who experiences eating what she sees.
 Polly and Bell (voiced by Alice Dinnean and Donna Kimball) are peach-colored twin white-spotted jellyfish. They live with their jellyfish siblings. These sisters like different things such as games, but according to their words, they come from the same polyp.
 Polly and Bell's siblings (voiced by Dorien Davies and Alice Dinnean) are the twin sisters of Polly and Bell. They both live in the Sunken Ship as their home with Polly and Bell. They are also called: peach-colored twin white-spotted jellyfish. Their voices are squeaky unlike Polly and Bell.    
 Charlie (Nickname: Papa) (voiced by Dan Garza) is a brownish goldish Barbour's seahorse which lives with Ripple and her 499 brothers. He has a yellow body and he refers to her as mija, which literally translated as "my daughter" in Spanish. He likes mysid shrimp as his favorite food.
 Ripple's 499 brothers (voiced by Leslie Carrara-Rudolph, Sarah Oh, Raymond Carr, and Donna Kimball) are all of the green Barbour's seahorses. Number 66 (voiced by Sarah Oh) wants to go on adventures like his sister. Number 278 always wanders off like number 66. She also mentions that number 342 is a storyteller, number 96 makes the silliest faces, number 77 sleeps next to her every night and number 231 always stealing her things.
 Melody is a female fin whale whose brother is in the Southern Ocean which is opposite to the Arctic. She helps Splash and his friends get home twice.
 Mrs. Leafy and Mr. Leafy are a friendly leafy seadragon couple that reside in a kelp forest off the coast of Australia.
 Maury (voiced by John Tartaglia) is a quidnunc snowflake moray who lives in the caves and tunnels of Reeftown and is always eager to gather news of what goes on around the reef.
 Snap (voiced by Dan Garza) is a pistol shrimp who can't see very well, doesn't like moving and sometimes attacks with his big claw when he thinks they say "Now!"
 Scout (voiced by Donna Kimball) is a goby fish who helps and protects Snap.
 Denny (voiced by Sarah Oh) is a cleaner shrimp who acts as Reeftown's "dentist", and has an extensive knowledge of teeth.
 Myshell is a decorative decorator crab who likes to have her shell decorated. Her name is a pun on the phrase "my shell".
 Dorsal is a spinner dolphin, he likes playing games, and making friends.
 Finny is a green mandarin dragonet with freckled cheeks who has similar interests with Bubbles, like being messy.
 Mo is a sunfish who is Dunk's cousin. 
 Tyke is a harbor seal who loves to snuggle with friends by nuzzling. She even gets carried away by playing.
 Scoot is a young sea turtle.

One-time characters
 Plum, Ruby, Rose and Violet are red giant tube worms who finish each other's sentences.
 Mortimer is a little nautilus who seems shy at first, but then is excited to talk.
 Puffy is a purple pufferfish who has indigo eyelids.
 Oblo is a blobfish.
 Dusty is a green and gray parrotfish.
 Neat is a yellow garibaldi who is Tidy's wife.
 Wart is a frogfish. His body is orange colored compared to his dad's purple body.
 Boo Hagley is a hagfish with a British accent.
 Archie is a sea urchin whose color seems unknown.
 Whitebeard is an ancient humpback whale with barnacles on his chin. He is the Santa Claus of the Arctic Ocean, but way deep under the North Pole.

The jellyfish
 There are four Christmas-colored white-spotted jellyfish who appear to be Reeftown tourists. Two are red and the other two are green. Their voices are squeaky unlike Polly and Bell.

The sharks
 Hamilton is a friendly scalloped hammerhead shark.
 A friendly unnamed great white shark.

Episodes

Film

Songs

Home media

Awards and nominations

Notes

References

External links

2010s American animated television series
2010s preschool education television series
2016 American television series debuts
2018 American television series endings
American children's animated adventure television series
American children's animated comedy television series
American children's animated fantasy television series
American children's animated musical television series
American computer-animated television series
American preschool education television series
American television shows featuring puppetry
American television series with live action and animation
Animated preschool education television series
Animated television series about fish
English-language television shows
PBS Kids shows
PBS original programming
Television series by The Jim Henson Company